Michael Robert Morgan (born November 30, 1959 in Dallas, Texas) is an American Texas and electric blues musician. He has released 14 albums to date, on various record labels including Rounder, Black Top and Severn Records. The majority of his releases have featured his long standing backing band, The Crawl. Morgan has played alongside Darrell Nulisch, Lee McBee, Gary Primich, and Randy McAllister.

Biography
Morgan was born in Dallas, but grew up in Hillsboro, Texas. He received his first guitar at an early age, and initially concentrated on playing rock music. In 1985 he converted to blues and blues-rock, before relocating back to Dallas in 1986.  There he met Darrell Nulisch, who both were founding members of The Crawl.  The group was named for a Lonnie Brooks song.

Mike Morgan and the Crawl earned a reputation playing around Dallas and the Fort Worth area, before Nulisch left them in 1989, to be replaced by the singer and harmonica player, Lee McBee. Following a performance at the New Orleans Jazz & Heritage Festival, their debut 1990 album, Raw & Ready, saw them undertake national and international tours. Further albums including Full Moon Over Dallas, and Ain't Worried No More ensued, before Morgan recorded without his backing group on Let The Dogs Run (1994) with Jim Suhler. In 1994 Mike Morgan and the Crawl appeared on the bill at the Notodden Blues Festival. Later group releases included their Black Top swansong, I Like the Way You Work It, but at the end of the 1990s McBee left the band. Buoyed by the experience of playing behind Nulisch, Keith Dunn, and Chris Whynaught, 2000's Texas Man saw Morgan's vocalist debut. Live in Dallas (2004) followed before Morgan's latest effort, Stronger Every Day, released in March 2008, included further accompaniment from McBee and Randy McAllister.

Recent activity has seen a reduction in touring, and Morgan working as a sales manager in a Mesquite, Texas, motorcycle dealership.

Discography
Raw & Ready (1990) - Black Top
Mighty Fine Dancin''' (1991) - Black TopFull Moon over Dallas (1992) - Black TopAin't Worried No More (1994) - Black TopLet the Dogs Run (1994) - Black TopLooky Here! (1996) - Black TopLowdown & Evil (1997) - ZensorThe Road (1998) - Black TopI Like the Way You Work It (1999) - Black TopTexas Man (2000) - Severn RecordsLive in Dallas (2004) - Severn RecordsFree Ourselves (2005) - Mike MorganStronger Every Day (2008) - Severn RecordsThe Lights Went Out in Dallas'' (2022) - M.C. Records

See also
List of Texas blues musicians
List of electric blues musicians

References

External links
Official website

1959 births
Living people
American blues guitarists
American male guitarists
American blues singers
American male singers
Songwriters from Texas
American blues harmonica players
Harmonica blues musicians
Electric blues musicians
Musicians from Dallas
Texas blues musicians
Guitarists from Texas
20th-century American guitarists
People from Hillsboro, Texas
20th-century American male musicians
American male songwriters